The Magic Crystal, also released as Santa's Magic Crystal and The Elf that Rescued Christmas in the UK, is a 2011 Finnish-Belgian computer-animated Christmas film directed by Antti Haikala from a screenplay by Haikala, Bob Swain, Dan Wicksman, Nuria Wicksman and Alessandro Liggieri.The film is part of a unified multimedia concept developed by Mikael Wahlfors , which also includes Andrew Bernhardt's Special Patrol children's books, and a 26-part animated series Red Caps and a mobile app World Polar Heroes. The Magic Crystal was produced by the Epidem ZOT, Aranéo and Skyline Animation.

It was released in Belgium in November 2 2011 and on 18 of the same month in Finland, the film was a box office bomb, grossing $340,836 against a budget of €5,074,000 ($).

Plot 
Once a year, thanks to the power of his “Magic Crystal”, Santa Claus multiplies into millions of himself and leaves his super high-tech headquarters in the Arctic Circle to bring presents to all the world's children. But this year, Santa’s evil twin, the bitter and envious Basil, has a diabolical plan: he will steal the crystal right before Christmas and use it to control the minds of kids everywhere. With the help of Santa’s loyal elves and his little friend, the adorable squirrel Jiffy, the young orphan boy Yotan must risk his life in a leap of faith and courage that might just be the only way to save Christmas.

Cast 
 Kyle E. Christensen as Yotan/Jonas
 Jukka Nylund as Yotan/Jonas (Finnish dub)
 Clarissa Humm as Jaga
 Paula Vesala as Jaga (Finnish dub)
 Lisa Kent as Jiffy
 Kiti Kokkonen as Jiffy (Finnish dub)
 Gerald Owens as Basil
 Veeti Kallio as Basil (Finnish dub)
 David Dreisen as Grouch/Lätty
 Antti Jaakola as Grouch/Lätty (Finnish dub)
 CJ Fam as Didi
 Henni-Liisa Stam as Didi (Finnish dub)
 Michael Mena as Smoo
 Jon-Jon Geitel as Smoo (Finnish dub)
 Mathew Wetcher as Alpo
 Aapo Haikala as Alpo (Finnish dub)
 Joe Carey as Santa/Joulupukki
 Veikko Honkanen as Santa/Joulupukki (Finnish dub)

Release 
The Magic Crystal was released in Finnish cinemas on 18 November 2011 by Future Film.

Box office performance 
The Magic Crystal was a box office bomb. It received 5,000 admissions during its opening weekend, ending with 16,865 during its entire theatrical run, which equates to $195,599 according to Box Office Mojo. In Belgium, it grossed $74,096. The film was later released in Lebanon on 13 December 2012, where it grossed $71,141 for a worldwide total box office gross of €340,836 against a budget of €5,074,000 ($). It was the 86th most-watched film in Finland of 2011 by number of admissions. According to Peter Toiviainen, manager of marketing at Future Film, the reason for the film's underperformance at the box office was because "the novelty value of domestic 3D films is now lower than it was two years ago", and competition from The Twilight Saga: Breaking Dawn – Part 1, which premiered at the same time as The Magic Crystal.

Reception 
Common Sense Media gave the film 3 out of 5 stars and the disclaimer: "Finnish Christmas adventure has some cartoonish violence."

See also 
 The Flight Before Christmas (2008 film)

References

External links 
 
 
 The Magic Crystal at Elonet—Finnish film database (in Finnish)

2011 films
2011 3D films
2011 computer-animated films
Animated Christmas films
Finnish animated films
Finnish children's films
Finnish Christmas films
Finnish fantasy adventure films
Belgian adventure films
Belgian animated films
Belgian children's fantasy films
Santa Claus in film